Tatsuo Suzuki may refer to:

, Japanese cinematographer
, Japanese karateka